Transcription elongation regulator 1, also known as TCERG1, is a protein which in humans is encoded by the TCERG1 gene.

Function 

This gene encodes a nuclear protein that regulates transcriptional elongation and pre-mRNA splicing. The encoded protein interacts with the hyperphosphorylated C-terminal domain of RNA polymerase II via multiple FF domains, and with the pre-mRNA splicing factor SF1 via a WW domain. Alternative splicing results in multiple transcripts variants encoding different isoforms.

Interactions
Transcription elongation regulator 1 has been shown to interact with SF1 and POLR2A.

References

Further reading